The Heath Is Green is a 1951 West German drama film directed by Hans Deppe and starring Sonja Ziemann, Rudolf Prack, and Maria Holst.

Plot
The film is set in the Lüneburg Heath region. The plot centers around a poacher (Lüder Lüdersen), a game warden (Walter Rainer) hunting the poacher, the murder of a police officer, and two love affairs. The main love affair and the main source of moral conflict is between the game keeper and the poacher's daughter (Helga Lüdersen). The film has a happy ending, the murderer is arrested, Helga and Walter become a couple.

Cast
 Sonja Ziemann as Helga Lüdersen
 Rudolf Prack as Walter Rainer
 Maria Holst as Nora von Buckwitz
 Willy Fritsch as judge
 Hans Stüwe as Lüder Lüdersen
 Hans Richter as Hannes
 Otto Gebühr as Gottfried Lüdersen
 Oskar Sima as circus manager
 Kurt Reimann as Nachtigall
 Ludwig Schmitz as Tünnes
 Josef Sieber as Oberförster (head game warden)
 Margarete Haagen as Mrs. Lüdersen
 Else Reval as Frau Zirkusdirektor
 Karl Finkenzeller as Pistek
 Ernst Waldow as pharmacist

Production
Grün ist die Heide is based on an eponymous novel by Hermann Löns. An earlier movie version was made in 1932.

Cinematography took place from 28 August to 16 September 1951 in the Lüneburg Heath and at Bleckede, and from 19 September to 26 September in the Tempelhof Studios in Berlin.

A third movie with the same name from 1972 was not a remake, but just used some of Löns' poems for song lyrics.

Reception
The FSK gave the film a rating of "6 and up" and deemed it suitable for screening on public holidays.

The film premiered on 14 November 1951 at the Palast in Hanover. It was the most successful release of the 1951/1952 season in Germany. It is an example of the Heimatfilm genre of post-WW II West German cinema.

In 1952, it received the Bambi Award as the most successful film.

References

External links

1951 films
1951 drama films
German drama films
West German films
1950s German-language films
Films directed by Hans Deppe
Films based on German novels
Films about hunters
Remakes of German films
Gloria Film films
Films shot at Tempelhof Studios
1950s German films